Kealakekua is a census-designated place (CDP) in Hawaii County, Hawaii, United States. The population was 2,019 at the 2010 census, up from 1,645 at the 2000 census.

It was the subject of the 1933 popular song, "My Little Grass Shack in Kealakekua, Hawaii" by Bill Cogswell, Tommy Harrison and Johnny Noble, which became a Hawaiian music standard.

Geography
Kealakekua is located on the west side of the island of Hawaii at  (19.526436, −155.922891). It is bordered to the north by Honalo and to the south by Captain Cook. Hawaii Route 11 is the main road through the community, leading north  to Kailua-Kona and south  to Naalehu.

Demographics

As of the census of 2000, there were 1,645 people, 639 households, and 423 families residing in the CDP. The racial makeup of the CDP was 24.74% White, 0.73% African American, 0.67% Native American, 36.84% Asian, 7.23% Pacific Islander, 2.07% from other races, and 27.72% from two or more races. Hispanic or Latino of any race were 9.18% of the population.

There were 639 households, out of which 25.5% had children under the age of 18 living with them, 49.0% were married couples living together, 12.2% had a female householder with no husband present, and 33.8% were non-families. 26.9% of all households were made up of individuals, and 9.2% had someone living alone who was 65 years of age or older.  The average household size was 2.57 and the average family size was 3.10.

In the CDP the population was spread out, with 22.1% under the age of 18, 7.7% from 18 to 24, 25.3% from 25 to 44, 27.5% from 45 to 64, and 17.3% who were 65 years of age or older.  The median age was 42 years. For every 100 females, there were 91.5 males.  For every 100 females age 18 and over, there were 89.2 males.

The median income for a household in the CDP was $38,026, and the median income for a family was $45,192. Males had a median income of $29,333 versus $25,000 for females. The per capita income for the CDP was $21,495.  About 9.2% of families and 13.7% of the population were below the poverty line, including 17.1% of those under age 18 and 6.3% of those age 65 or over.

Education

Hawaii Department of Education operates Konawaena Elementary School, which has a Kealakekua postal address but is in the Captain Cook CDP.

Two schools, Konawaena Middle School and Konawaena High School, are on a campus partially in Captain Cook CDP and partially in Kealakekua CDP.

Kona Pacific Public Charter School, founded in 2008, serves students in kindergarten through Grade 8.

Notable people
Harry Kiyoshi Ishisaka (1927–1978), important figure in the development of aikido in southern California
Keala Keanaaina (born 1973), American football player
Henry Ōpūkaha`ia (1792–1818), a resident of Kealakekua, at 15 years old Ōpūkaha`ia boarded the Triumph to New Haven, Connecticut, where he was educated at Yale and was the impetus for Christian missionaries' arrival in Hawaii in 1820
Ellison Shoji Onizuka (1946–1986), American astronaut lost in the destruction of Space Shuttle Challenger
Douglas A. Zembiec (1973–2007), U.S. Marine Corps officer, Iraq and Afghanistan veteran, Silver Star, Bronze Star and two-time Purple Heart recipient

See also 
 Kealakekua Bay, where the British explorer Captain James Cook was killed

References

Census-designated places in Hawaii County, Hawaii
Populated places on Hawaii (island)